Long Drive is a 2023 Indian Kannada-language film written and directed by Sri Raju G, and produced by Manjunath Gowda BR under Goodwheel Production. The film stars Arjun Yogesh Raj Supritha Sathyanarayan and Tejaswini Shekhar, with a music score by Vikas Vassishta. It was released in India on 10 February 2023. The Long Drive was edited by Ramisetty Pavan who edited the state award winning movie Shuddhi

Plot
The film is about a software engineer from Banglore, named Arjun and his girlfriend, Dr Janaki.

Dr Janaki wanted to go on a date for a long drive with his boyfriend Arjun on his birthday  
where they encounter Mani who captures their intimate moment and threatens them to share it on Social media.

Both Dr Janaki and Arjun are Torcher and Harassed for Money. Arjun's mobile battery was down to transfer funds to Mani so Many take him to his form house to charge his mobile. Mani tries to make a move on Janaki when Arjun is away and in front of him. meanwhile, the other two of Mani's associates Bala(an auto driver) and Shiva join Mani in his form house and harass both Arjun and Janaki finally after receiving some money  Mani leaves bother of them. now couples move back to their place without talking. Janki scolds him badly saying the way he behaved like a beggar rather than fighting for justice.

with Jankasi's insult, Arjun goes back to the place where the incident happened where he first meet Bala since Arujin was masked Bala dint recognise him and takes him to one no man's location and beat Bala badly later gets the details about Mani and that today is mani marriage anniversary so he goes as Mani driver and picks Mani's daughter and wife to Manis  Adda (his secret hangout spot ) and  call mani to the same place and harass him and tells about him to his wife and a big fight happens  and he leaves from the place

In the end, Mani is a changed man who guides the couples, not to Rome around isolated places like this everyone will not be as good as Mani.

Cast

 Arjun Yogesh Raj as Arjun
 Supritha Sathyanarayan as Dr Janaki
 Tejaswini Shekar as Meera
 Manjunath Gowda B.R. as Mani
 Balarajwadi as Bala
 Keerthi Gym as Suri
 Guru Mahesh as Shiva

Release
Long Drive was released on 10 February 2023 in India.

Reception

Reviewing Long Drive for The Times of India, Harish Basavarajaiah, gave 3.5 out of 5 stars and praising the realism of the story, Arjun Yogi has delivered an even performance, representing the youth. With the right choice of films, he is likely to join the chocolate heroes of Sandalwood. Manjunath is impressive as a rugged villain in his first attempt. Supritha and Tejaswini have done a good job. The movie has limited roles, which is also its biggest plus. Director Sriraj, in his debut attempt, has chosen to tell a story that is common in society. It has translated well on screen. Kitty Koushik's cinematography and music by Vikas Vasishta complement the stories... ".

References

External links

2023 films
Films set in Karnataka
Films shot in Karnataka
Indian romantic thriller films